The 2002 Royal Bank Cup is the 32nd Junior "A" 2002 ice hockey National Championship for the Canadian Junior A Hockey League.

The Royal Bank Cup was competed for by the winners of the Doyle Cup, Anavet Cup, Dudley Hewitt Cup, the Fred Page Cup and a host city.

The tournament will be hosted by the Halifax Oland Exports in Halifax, Nova Scotia.

The Playoffs

Round Robin

Results
Halifax Exports defeat Chilliwack Chiefs 4-3 in Overtime
Ottawa Jr. Senators defeat Rayside-Balfour Sabrecats 4-3
Halifax Exports defeat OCN Blizzard 4-3 in Overtime
Chilliwack Chiefs defeat Rayside-Balfour Sabrecats 9-2
OCN Blizzard defeat Ottawa Jr. Senators 4-3 in Overtime
Halifax Exports defeat Ottawa Jr. Senators 2-1
Chilliwack Chiefs defeat OCN Blizzard 8-5
Halifax Exports defeat Rayside-Balfour Sabrecats 6-3
OCN Blizzard defeat Rayside-Balfour Sabrecats 5-0
Chilliwack Chiefs defeat Ottawa Jr. Senators 5-3

Semi and Finals

Awards
Most Valuable Player: Jeff Tambellini (Chilliwack Chiefs)
Top Scorer: Jeff Tambellini (Chilliwack Chiefs)
Most Sportsmanlike Player: Jason Snow (Halifax Oland Exports)
Top Goalie: Scott Gouthro (Halifax Oland Exports)
Top Forward: Matt Quinn (Halifax Oland Exports)
Top Defenceman: Jeff Barlow (Chilliwack Chiefs)

Roll of League Champions
AJHL: Drayton Valley Thunder
BCHL: Chilliwack Chiefs
CJHL: Ottawa Jr. Senators
MJHL: OCN Blizzard
MJAHL: Halifax Oland Exports
NOJHL: Rayside-Balfour Sabrecats
OPJHL: Brampton Capitals
QJAAAHL: Valleyfield Braves
SJHL: Kindersley Klippers
SIJHL: Dryden Ice Dogs

See also
Canadian Junior A Hockey League
Royal Bank Cup
Anavet Cup
Doyle Cup
Dudley Hewitt Cup
Fred Page Cup

External links
Royal Bank Cup Website

2002
Ice hockey competitions in Halifax, Nova Scotia
Royal Bank Cup
2002 in Nova Scotia